Ugly Noise is the eleventh studio album by the thrash metal band Flotsam and Jetsam, released on December 21, 2012. In order to make this album, Flotsam and Jetsam used PledgeMusic, encouraging their fans to contribute funds to its recording and the band themselves to donate to charity as a part of their fundraising.

Ugly Noise marked the first Flotsam and Jetsam album recorded with two of its original members Michael Gilbert (guitar) and Kelly David Smith (drums) since 1997's High. Original bassist Jason Newsted also co-wrote some songs for the album, but did not officially rejoin the band. It is the last album to feature Jason Ward on bass, and Edward Carlson on guitar, although he would be featured on the re-recording of No Place for Disgrace.

Track listing

Personnel
 Eric A. "A.K." Knutson — vocals
 Ed Carlson — guitar
 Michael Gilbert — guitar
 Jason Ward — bass
 Kelly David-Smith — drums

References

2012 albums
Flotsam and Jetsam (band) albums